Maloja may refer to:

Maloja District, an administrative district in the Swiss canton of Graubünden
Maloja Palace, a hotel in the Swiss canton of Graubünden
Maloja Pass, an Alpine pass in the Swiss canton of Graubünden
Maloja Region, one of eleven administrative districts in the canton of Graubünden in Switzerland
Maloja, a village near the summit of the Maloja Pass which is part of the Swiss municipality of Bregaglia in the Maloja District
, a P&O passenger liner built in 1923 and scrapped in 1954
, a P&O passenger liner built in 1911 and mined in 1916